The Ebonyi State College of Education is a state government higher education institution located in Ikwo, Ebonyi State, Nigeria. It is affiliated to Ebonyi State University for its degree programmes. The current Provost is Benedict Edigbo Mbam.

History 
The Ebonyi State College of Education was established in 2001. It was formerly a College of Agriculture which originated from the Norwegian Church Agricultural Project (NORCAP).

Courses 
The institution offers the following courses;

 Computer Education
 Economics
 Christian Religious Studies
 Igbo
 Geography
 Physical And Health Education
 Mathematics Education
 Fine And Applied Arts
 Biology Education
 Political Science
 Chemistry Education
 English Education
 Fisheries Technology
 Agricultural Science Education
 History
 Integrated Science Education

References 

Universities and colleges in Nigeria
2001 establishments in Nigeria